Matthew "Matt" Porterfield (born October 6, 1977) is an American independent filmmaker. He has made four feature films to date, Hamilton (2006), Putty Hill (2011), I Used to Be Darker (2013) and Sollers Point (2017). Putty Hill and I Used to Be Darker had their international premieres at the Berlin International Film Festival. All of his features have had their local premieres at the Maryland Film Festival.

Life and career
Porterfield was born in Baltimore, Maryland, and had formal training at the Tisch School of the Arts, New York University. He teaches screenwriting and production in the Film and Media Studies Program at Johns Hopkins University.

His low-budget debut feature, Hamilton, made on 16 mm film with a cast of non-professional actors from Baltimore, proved a "minor miracle", wrote Richard Brody in The New Yorker. The magazine went on to tag the film as "the most original, moving and an accomplished American independent film in recent years".

Considered a sleeper hit, Porterfield's Putty Hill again reverted to his hometown as the film revolves around a small working class community in Baltimore city. The film was critically acclaimed for combining documentary and narrative traditions into a lyrical study of memory and loss. It was featured in the 2013 Whitney Biennial.

His 2013 feature, I Used to Be Darker, conceived as a melodrama, showcased his ability to bring "melancholic tones" to life on the celluloid. The screenplay was co-written by Amy Belk and starred musicians Ned Oldham and Kim Taylor alongside newcomers Hannah Gross and Deragh Campbell. It premiered at The 2013 Sundance Film Festival and was released commercially in the United States, France, Germany, Austria, and South Korea.

Porterfield made his first narrative short, Take What You Can Carry, in Berlin in the summer of 2014. It premiered in the Berlinale Shorts Competition in 2015.

His next feature film, Sollers Point, premiered at San Sebastián International Film Festival in 2017.

Filmography 
 2006: Hamilton
 2010: Putty Hill
 2013: I Used to Be Darker
 2015: Take What You Can Carry (short)
 2017: Sollers Point
 2021: Cuatro paredes (short)

References

External links 
 
Lecturer page at Johns Hopkins University

American filmmakers
Artists from Baltimore
1977 births
Living people
Park School of Baltimore alumni